Greta may refer to:

Greta (given name), including a list of people and characters with the name

Places
 Greta Bridge, village in County Durham, England
 Greta, New South Wales, town in Australia
 Greta railway station
 Greta Army Camp, former Australian Army camp near the town of Greta
 Greta, Victoria, town in Australia

Natural history
 Greta (genus), butterfly genus in the family Nymphalidae
 Greta morgane (thick-tipped greta)
 Greta oto (glasswing)

Other
 Greta (2018 film), a thriller film directed by Neil Jordan
 Greta (2020 film), a documentary film about activist Greta Thunberg
 Greta (band), hard rock band
 Greta Van Fleet, hard rock band
 River Greta (disambiguation), one of three UK rivers
 Hurricane Greta, name of several Atlantic storms
 Georgia Regional Transportation Authority, abbreviated GRTA and pronounced "Greta"
 Group of Experts on Action against Trafficking in Human Beings, abbreviated GRETA